John S. Renninger (October 10, 1924 – April 2, 2005) was a Republican member of the Pennsylvania House of Representatives.

References

Republican Party members of the Pennsylvania House of Representatives
1924 births
2005 deaths
20th-century American politicians